The 1981 Tour de France was the 68th edition of the Tour de France, taking place between 25 June and 19 July. It was dominated by Bernard Hinault, who led the race from the sixth stage on, increasing his lead almost every stage. Only Phil Anderson was able to stay close to him, until the 16th stage when he fell behind by about 7:00, and then on the 17th stage he would lose another 17 minutes. In the end only Lucien Van Impe, Robert Alban and Joop Zoetemelk were able to finish inside 20:00 of the now three time champ.

The points classification was won by Freddy Maertens, who did so by winning five stages. The mountains classification was won by Lucien Van Impe, Peter Winnen won the young rider classification, and the Peugeot team won the team classification.

Teams

Late 1980, there were plans to make the tour "open", which meant that amateur teams would also be allowed to join. This would make it possible for teams from Eastern Europe to join. The plan did not materialize, so only professional teams were invited. In January 1981, the organisation decided that there would be 15 teams with 10 cyclists, or 16 teams with 9 cyclists each. At that point, 16 teams had already submitted a request to join, and the organisation was in discussion with four additional Italian teams, and the American national team. In the end, the American team did not apply, and the Italian teams decided to focus on the 1981 Giro d'Italia. The organisation selected 15 teams, who each selected 10 cyclists, for a total of 150 participants.

The teams entering the race were:

Pre-race favourites

Bernard Hinault, the winner of the 1978 and 1979 Tour de France and reigning world champion, was the main favourite. His knee problems, that caused him to leave the 1980 Tour de France, were solved, and he was in form: Hinault had won important races in the spring, and he had skipped the 1981 Giro d'Italia to focus on the Tour.
His main rivals were 1980 Tour de France winner Joop Zoetemelk, 1976 Tour de France winner Lucien Van Impe and Joaquim Agostinho, although they had never been able to beat Hinault when he was in form, and of these rivals only Zoetemelk was ever able to keep Hinault within striking distance.

Freddy Maertens, the winner of the points classification in the Tour de France in 1976 and 1978, had won only three minor races in 1979 and 1980, but in 1981 he was selected again for the Tour.

Route and stages

The route for the 1981 Tour de France was revealed in December 1980. Originally, the thirteenth stage was planned as a time trial, followed by a transfer of more than 500 km on the same day, with the fourteenth stage the next day as a mountain stage. A few months before the Tour, there were many teams interested in the Tour, and the Tour organisation was afraid that there would not be enough time on 9 July to have the time trial for that many cyclists, followed by the transfer. For this reason, the thirteenth stage was changed into a criterium, and the fourteenth stage became the time trial. The 1981 Tour de France started on 25 June, and had two rest days, in Nantes and Morzine.

Race overview

Hinault started out strong and won the prologue. Freddy Maertens showed he was still able to win sprints by winning the first part of the first stage. The second part was a team time trial, won by TI–Raleigh, which put Gerrie Knetemann in the lead of the race. TI–Raleigh also won the second team time trial in stage four.

The Pyrenees were only briefly visited, in the fifth stage. For the last mountain, Hinault was the lead group, together with Lucien Van Impe and Phil Anderson. Van Impe escaped in the last kilometers and won the stage, 27 seconds ahead of Hinault. Anderson, who finished in third place, became the new leader, the first Australian cyclist to wear the yellow jersey. Anderson had started as domestique for Jean-René Bernaudeau, and nobody was expecting him to be able to follow Hinault. In the time trial of stage six, Hinault won as expected, and became the race leader. Anderson surprised with a third place, and he now followed Hinault by 13 seconds in the general classification.

In the following stages, through Northern France and Belgium, Hinault slowly increased his margin over Anderson by winning amelioration sprints, until lead by 57 seconds after stage 13. In stage 14, Hinault won the time trial, and added two more minutes to the margin.

In the sixteenth stage in the Alps, Anderson was not able to follow anymore. He lost 4 minutes to Hinault, but stayed in second place. Anderson lost this second place in the 17th stage, where he lost 17 minutes, making Van Impe the new second placed cyclist, nine minutes behind. Hinault showed his dominance by winning the eighteenth stage.

The time trial in stage 20 was also won by Hinault, who increased the margin to Van Impe to more than 14 minutes.

Doping
In the 16th stage, Claude Vincendeau was randomly selected to undergo a doping test. Vincendeau abandoned during that stage, and had already left to his hotel. One of the doctors then went to his hotel to obtain a urine sample, but Vincendeau was unable/unwanting to give it. This counted as a positive test.

Classification leadership and minor prizes

There were several classifications in the 1981 Tour de France, four of them awarding jerseys to their leaders. The most important was the general classification, calculated by adding each cyclist's finishing times on each stage. The cyclist with the least accumulated time was the race leader, identified by the yellow jersey; the winner of this classification is considered the winner of the Tour. The time bonus for stage winners had been absent in the years before, but it returned in 1981; 30, 20 and 10 seconds for the first three cyclists in every stage.

Additionally, there was a points classification, were cyclists got points for finishing among the best in a stage finish, or in intermediate sprints. The cyclist with the most points lead the classification, and was identified with a green jersey.

There was also a mountains classification. The organisation had categorised some climbs as either hors catégorie, first, second, third, or fourth-category; points for this classification were won by the first cyclists that reached the top of these climbs first, with more points available for the higher-categorised climbs. The cyclist with the most points lead the classification, and wore a white jersey with red polka dots.

Another classification was the young rider classification. This was decided the same way as the general classification, but only cyclists younger than 24 were eligible, and the leader wore a white jersey.

The fifth individual classification was the intermediate sprints classification. This classification had similar rules as the points classification, but only points were awarded on intermediate sprints. In 1981, this classification had no associated jersey.

For the team classification, the times of the best three cyclists per team on each stage were added; the leading team was the team with the lowest total time. The riders in the team that led this classification were identified by yellow caps. There was also a team points classification. Cyclists received points according to their finishing position on each stage, with the first rider receiving one point. The first three finishers of each team had their points combined, and the team with the fewest points led the classification. The riders of the team leading this classification wore green caps.

In addition, there was a combativity award given after each mass-start stage to the cyclist considered most combative. The split stages each had a combined winner. The decision was made by a jury composed of journalists who gave points. The cyclist with the most points from votes in all stages led the combativity classification. Bernard Hinault won this classification, and was given overall the super-combativity award. The Souvenir Henri Desgrange was given in honour of Tour founder Henri Desgrange to the first rider to pass a point in the Landes forest  before the end of stage 7 in Bordeaux. This prize was won by Theo de Rooij.

Final standings

General classification

Points classification

Mountains classification

Young rider classification

Combination classification

Intermediate sprints classification

Team classification

Team points classification

Combativity classification

Aftermath
The 1981 Tour de France is seen as the year in which the globalization of the Tour became important. Before that most cyclists came from France, Spain, Italy, Belgium, Luxemburg and the Netherlands, with only occasional successes by other European cyclists. Anderson was the first non-European cyclist to lead the Tour de France, and more would follow in the coming years. The plans to make the Tour de France open to amateurs were not forgotten, and it happened in 1983.

Anderson would again wear the yellow jersey in the next year, when he also won the young rider classification.

Hinault won five stages as reigning world champion. This had happened before, most recently in 1979 with Gerrie Knetemann and in 1980 with Jan Raas, but after 1981 it became a rare occurrence. The next time that this happened was in 2002 with Óscar Freire, and after that in 2011 with Thor Hushovd.

Maertens who also won five stages would make his comeback year complete by winning the 1981 UCI Road World Championships later that year, but after that never reached his 1981 level again.

Jacques Boyer became the first American to ride in the Tour de France, acting as a domestique for Hinault.

References

Bibliography

External links

 
Tour de France
Tour de France by year
Tour de France, 1981
Tour de France
Tour de France
1981 Super Prestige Pernod